Mothers Apart from Their Children (MATCH) has existed since 1979 as a non-judgmental support group, run by volunteers who are, or have been, mothers separated from their children after divorce, family breakdown, care orders, adoption or abduction. Separation can last several months, years or decades. Sometimes forever. In September 2006 MATCH was granted charitable status.

References
 https://web.archive.org/web/20040730154406/http://www.shebytes.com/splashdirectory/showorg.php?refnum=2952
 The mothers who fight 4 justice BBC Monday, 14 February 2005
 https://www.theguardian.com/lifeandstyle/2019/feb/21/helping-mothers-living-apart-from-their-children

External links
 Mothers Apart from Their Children

1979 establishments in the United Kingdom
Family and parenting issues groups in the United Kingdom
Organizations established in 1979
Support groups